This list contains the names of notable Japanese Americans who served in the United States Military and Intelligence Services in World War II.

A 
John F. Aiso (1909–1987)
Bumpei Akaji (1921–2002)
George Aratani (1917–2013)
George Ariyoshi (born 1926)
Koji Ariyoshi (1914–1976)

B 
Paul Bannai (1920–2019)
Tadao Beppu (1919–1993)

F 
Jerry Fujikawa (1912–1983)
Frank Fujita (1921–1996)
S. Neil Fujita (1921–2010)
Robert Fukuda (1922–2013)
Harry K. Fukuhara (1920–2015)

H 
Barney F. Hajiro (1916–2011)
Mikio Hasemoto (1916–1943)
Joe Hayashi (1920–1945)
Shizuya Hayashi (1917–2008)
Thomas Taro Higa (1916–1985)
Takashi "Halo" Hirose (died 2002)

I 
Chiyoki Ikeda (1920–1960)
Daniel Inouye (1924–2012)
Dale Ishimoto (1923–2004)
Susumu Ito (1919–2005)
Shori Iijima (1919-2022)

K 
Bill Kajikawa (1912–2010)
Ben Kamihira (1925–2004)
Isao Kikuchi (1921–2017)
Keichi Kimura (1914–1988)
Yeiki Kobashigawa (1917–2005)
Arthur Komori (1915–2000)
Robert T. Kuroda (1922–1944)
Ben Kuroki (1917–2015)

M 
Mike Masaoka (1915–1991)
Fujio Matsuda (1924–2020)
John Matsudaira (1922–2007)
Roy Matsumoto (1913–2014)
Spark Matsunaga (1916–1990)
Wataru Misaka (1923–2019)
Hiroshi H. Miyamura (1925–2022)
Jack Mizuha (1913–1986)
Kaoru Moto (1917–1992)
Sadao Munemori (1922–1945)
Kiyoshi K. Muranaga (1922–1944)
Shig Murao (1926–1999)

N 
Bill Naito (1925–1996)
Nakada brothers
Masato Nakae (1917–1998)
Shinyei Nakamine (1922–1944)
Edward Nakamura (1922–1997)
William K. Nakamura (1922–1944)
Lane Nakano (1925–2005)
Joe M. Nishimoto (1919–1944)

O
Tetsuo Ochikubo (1923–1975)
Ben Oda (1915–1984)
Kenje Ogata (1919–2012)
Allan M. Ohata (1918–1977)
John Okada (1923–1971)
James K. Okubo (1920–1967)
Yukio Okutsu (1921–2003)
Frank H. Ono (1923–1980)
Kazuo Otani (1918–1944)

S 
Albert Saijo (1926–2011)
Richard Sakakida (1920–1996) 
Harold Sakata (1920–1982)
George T. Sakato (1921–2015)
George Shibata (1926–1987)
Bell M. Shimada (1922–1958)
Tak Shindo (1922–2002)
Kobe Shoji (1920–2004)

T 
Shinkichi Tajiri (1923–2009)
James Takemori (1926–2015)
Francis Takemoto (1912–2002)
Chuzo Tamotzu (1888–1975)
Takuma Tanada (1919–2018)
Ted T. Tanouye (1919–1944)
Teruto Tsubota (1922 –2013)
Ted Tsukiyama (1920–2019) 
George Tsutakawa (1910–1997)

U 
Yosh Uchida (born 1920)

Y 
Taro Yamamoto (1919–1994)
Mitsu Yashima (1908–1988)
Taro Yashima (1908–1994)
Karl Yoneda (1906–1999)
Nadao Yoshinaga (1919–2009)
George Yuzawa (1915–2011)

See also 
Japanese American service in World War II
442nd Infantry Regiment
100th Infantry Battalion
Varsity Victory Volunteers
Military Intelligence Service
Lost Battalion
Go for Broke Monument

References 

Japanese-American history
American military personnel of Japanese descent
Japanese American
Japanese American in World War II
Japanese American in World War II